The chestnut-crested cotinga (Ampelion rufaxilla) is a species of bird in the family Cotingidae.

It is found in the northern Andes of Bolivia, Colombia, Ecuador, and Peru. Its natural habitat is subtropical or tropical moist montane forests.  Because of its large range and population density this species is not classified as vulnerable.

References

chestnut-crested cotinga
chestnut-crested cotinga
Taxonomy articles created by Polbot